Barton Academy was a high school in the town of Barton and also served surrounding towns for over a century. The high school (the Academy) was replaced by the Lake Region High School on September 11, 1967. The Academy alumni continue to meet annually. They fund scholarships for graduates of Lake Region. The building also housed the town's grammar school.

History
The Academy started in the fall of 1852 in a building on the location now occupied by the school parking lot. There is an early list of students who were enrolled. It was chartered by the legislature in 1854.

A listing of graduates from 1926, lists the first class as 1886.

The cornerstone of the current building is marked "1907." the project was the biggest building project, the town had ever seen. It cost $42,000. An Indian burial ground was discovered during the excavation. There is no record of what happened to those artifacts. The former school was moved across the street in 1909 and later used as a gymnasium and cafeteria. It was torn down in 1980.

In the early 1900s, Barton Academy ranked eighth among all high schools, public and private, in Vermont.

The Academy closed in 1967, replaced by the Lake Region Union High School. The former building, with the name, "Barton Academy and Graded School", carved on a  granite slab over the entryway, is used as an elementary school.

An addition was completed in 1979.

Architecture
Architectural historians Glenn Andres and Curtis Johnson commented that the school had a "finely proportioned central pavilion with quoina and a broken pediment, and a Palladian porch that screens a recessed entrance.." and "There is a finesse and logic to the composition that makes this village school more than a pastiche of derivative details, perhaps indicative of industrial Barton's commercial ties to major centers of taste."

Principals
Benjamin Hinman Steele, briefly when he was 20 in 1853 or so, a young graduate of Dartmouth and simultaneously studying for the law at the same time! Went on to become a judge on the Vermont Supreme Court and died at the age of 37
George W. Quimby - about 1859 to 1862. Captain in Civil War, 4th Vermont Infantry, Company D. Killed December 13, 1862, at the Battle of Fredericksburg 
Emilie M. Gleason - June 1877

Athletics
The Academy fielded Basketball Teams for both boys and girls and a boys baseball team. It fielded a soccer team beginning about 1958. School colors were orange and black. The mascot was the Yellow Peril. The school's main rival was cross-town Orleans High School.

Recognition
State Class C Champions, Baseball 1951

Notable graduates
 Lee E. Emerson (1917), Governor of Vermont
 Robert Kinsey (1965?) state representative from Craftsbury (1970-2000
 Francis W. Nye (1936), Major General commanding the Sandia, NM Atomic Laboratory
 Marion Redfield (1907) - elected to state House of Representatives 1956-?

Notable Attendees

Wallace Harry Gilpin attended briefly in the late 1890s. Owned the Orleans County Monitor 1904-1953
Frederick H. Pillsbury representative from Sutton in 1902. Attended BA in early 1890s.

References

External links
 NEKG Vital Records of Vermont Schools

Educational institutions established in 1852
Educational institutions disestablished in 1967
1967 disestablishments in Vermont
1852 establishments in Vermont
Buildings and structures demolished in 1980
Former high schools in Vermont
Schools in Orleans County, Vermont
Buildings and structures in Barton, Vermont
Barton (village), Vermont